Costly may refer to:

People
Anthony Costly (born 1954), Honduran footballer
Carlo Costly (born 1982), Honduran footballer
Marcel Costly (born 1995), German footballer

Entertainment
Costly (album), an album by Ghost Ship
Costly (card game), a traditional English card game related to Cribbage

See also